Bánh đậu xanh (餅豆靑, mung bean pastry) is a type of bánh in Vietnamese and Chinese cuisine. It is a specialty of Hải Dương province.  Lüdou gao (绿豆糕, mung bean pastry) and lüdou huang (綠豆黄) are two types of mung bean pastries, with the former being dry and the latter being wet and fermented.

See also 
 Dasik

References

External links
 Photos of Chinese lüdou huang, which is closer to Vietnamese bánh đậu xanh than lüdou gao does

Vietnamese pastries
Chinese cuisine